Juniper Foundation 
is an organization that works to adapt and promote meditation tradition in the modern world. It was founded in 2003 by five individuals, Segyu Choepel Rinpoche, Hillary Brook Levy, Christina Juskiewicz, Pam Moriarty and Lawrence Levy. Juniper calls its approach "meditation tradition for modern life"  and it emphasizes meditation, balancing emotions, cultivating compassion and developing insight as four building blocks of meditation training.

Approach 
Juniper holds that Buddhist ideas have enormous potential to benefit modern culture but, to do so, their religious and cultural wrapper must be removed so modern individuals can access these methods in a way that matches their sensibility and psychology. These methods must become integrated into modern culture just as they were in the cultures of India, China, Japan, Tibet and others. The 14th Dalai Lama acknowledged this principle when, in his book The Meaning of Life from a Buddhist Perspective, he wrote 

It is important to adopt the essence of Buddha's teaching, recognizing that Buddhism as it is practiced by Tibetans is influenced by Tibetan culture and thus it would be a mistake to try to practice a Tibetanized form of Buddhism. 

Because Buddhist ideas value inquiry and critical thinking, Juniper holds that we can apply these to build a bridge from ancient culture to modern life, one that is grounded in tradition but evolved to embrace discovery and modern social norms.

Lineage 
Buddhist thought is not based on a centralized authority but is held in lineages. Juniper's lineage is from an Indo-Tibetan Buddhist tradition dating back over two thousand years to the time of the Buddha. This lineage passed through India and Tibet and came to Juniper through its Brazilian born co-founder Segyu Choepel Rinpoche. In 1984, Segyu Rinpoche was recognized by the 98th Ganden Tripa, the spiritual leader of the Gelug (Dge-lugs) school of Tibetan Buddhism, as a master and holder of a Gelug lineage known as the Segyu (Sed Gyued). Segyu Rinpoche's primary teacher was Kyabje Lati Rinpoche (1922-2010), the former abbot of Ganden Shartse Monastery, under whom Segyu Rinpoche received the full gelong monastic ordination. For over twenty-five years Segyu Rinpoche studied under, and received initiations from, Kyabje Lati Rinpoche, Khensur Tara Tulku Rinpoche and other masters of the Gelug school.  In tandem with his training, Segyu Rinpoche studied Tibetan Medicine, a tradition of healing that integrates the philosophy and practices of the Buddhist path. Through Segyu Rinpoche, Juniper works to pass the knowledge and methods of its lineage to others in a manner that propagates those methods in a secular form.

Publications 
 Awakening the Mind: The Path of Meditation

Location 
Juniper is a 501(c)(3) non-profit organization located in San Jose, California.

References

External links 
 Juniper Foundation - official website 
 Tricycle Magazine, Buddhist Training for Modern Life, An Interview with the Founder of the Juniper School, Segyu Rinpoche 
 A Precious Jewel for the East and West 
 Juniper: pragmatic Buddhism for secular seekers? 
 The Secular Buddhist 
 Modern Meditation Washington DC 
 Tibetanlama.com 
 Ipeamarelo: treinamento budista para a vida moderna 
 PAULA EL PAIS, Un Espíritu Terrenal 

Buddhist organizations based in the United States
Buddhism in the United States
Meditation